James Francis McGrath (May 23, 1859 – October 29, 1902) was a fisherman and political figure in Newfoundland. He represented Placentia and St. Mary's in the Newfoundland and Labrador House of Assembly from 1885 to 1894 as a Liberal.

Biography
James F. McGrath was born in Little Placentia, the son of Richard McGrath and Margaret Fanning. He was raised and educated in Oderin where his father was Customs Collector and Stipendary Magistrate. He received his secondary education at Saint Bonaventure's College in St.John's. McGrath began work as a fisherman operating his own boat and later owned a fishing business operating catching cod on the Grand Banks and herring. First elected MHA for the district of Placentia and St. Mary's in 1885 (a position his father had held in the past). He served as a member of the Newfoundland Fisheries Commission from 1889 to 1895. He was re-elected in 1893 and was named to the Executive Council as chairman of the Board of Works. He was forced to resign from the assembly the following year after the Tories filed petitions against 15 Liberal and one Independent incumbent for partisan use of government funds. He was disqualified from holding office again.

His brother Richard was elected to represent Placentia and St. Mary's in the subsequent by-election. In 1895, McGrath was named governor of the Newfoundland penitentiary, a position he filled from Apr 1 1895 until his death in 1902. He was married three times: first in 1882 to Theresa Mary Power (1859–1886), then in 1889 to Catherine (Kate) McCarthy (1859–1895) and finally in 1896 to Mary Anne (Min) Aylward (1859–1943). In all he had 6 children, 3 boys and 3 girls (including twin daughters who died as children). One son John William McGrath worked as secretary and advisor to Theodore Roosevelt but died in 1924 at the age of 32 in Boston, Mass. Son James became a doctor and eventually entered politics, becoming Minister of Health in the Smallwood government. Daughter Elizabeth Anne McGrath studied law and in 1934 was the second woman admitted to the bar in Newfoundland. James Francis McGrath died in Halifax at the age of 43 while returning from kidney surgery in Boston following an emergency operation by his uncle Dr. Donald A Campbell. His body was returned to St. John's, Newfoundland and he was buried in the Belvedere Roman Catholic Cemetery.

References 

Members of the Newfoundland and Labrador House of Assembly
1859 births
1902 deaths
Newfoundland Colony people